Mosquito Creek is a stream in Chincoteague, Virginia that connects with Cockle Creek to the south and a mouth at Chincoteague Bay to the North.

History
The name of the creek first appeared in the Decisions of the United States Board on Geographical Names in 1943.

See also
List of Virginia rivers

References

Chincoteague, Virginia
Rivers of Accomack County, Virginia
Rivers of Virginia